Pope Gabriel VIII of Alexandria was the 97th Pope of Alexandria and Patriarch of the See of St. Mark.

Gabriel VIII was originally from Meer, Egypt and his lay name was Shenouda. He became a monk in the Monastery of Saint Pishoy in Scetes and was ordained on Sunday, 16 Paoni, 1303 A.M. (June 20, 1587 AD).  Avva Zacharias, Bishop of Jerusalem, and Avva Kyrellos El-Khiami led Gabriel's consecration in the Church of Saint Mercurius in Old Cairo. At the time of his ordination the Copts were divided, and they chose for themselves four different patriarchs.  Gabriel's papacy was later accepted by the Coptic community. He was contemporary of the Ottoman Sultan Ahmed I.

During his papacy, Gabriel VIII decreed that the Fast of the Apostles must start on 21 Paoni and end on 5 Epip, and that Advent must start on the first of Koiak. He also suppressed the Fast of Jonah, and allowed the Fast of the Dormition of the Virgin Mary to be optional.  The Copts at the time accepted these decisions, but the fasts were reinstituted after his death.

Gabriel VIII died on 9 Pashons, 1319 A.M. (May 14, 1603 AD) in the Syrian Monastery. He occupied the Throne of Saint Mark for 15 years, 10 month, and 24 days.

References

Coptic Synexarion

1603 deaths
16th-century Coptic Orthodox popes of Alexandria
Year of birth unknown
17th-century Coptic Orthodox popes of Alexandria